The German steam locomotives of Palatine Class P 3.I were operated by the Palatinate Railway and were the first engines in Germany with a 4-4-2 (Atlantic) wheel arrangement. The two-cylinder saturated steam locomotives with inside cylinders had in addition to an inside bar frame a characteristic outer frame for the rear part of the locomotive, that partly covered the driving wheels. The valve gear was of the Joy type.

In 1898 and 1899 Krauss initially built eleven locomotives; in 1904 a twelfth followed that was equipped with a Pielock superheater. Although the P 3s met their intended performance criteria, they were soon overtaxed by increasingly long trains.

The Palatinate Railway decided therefore on an unusual conversion: in 1913 the two-cylinder engine was converted into a four-cylinder compound engine by the addition of two outside cylinders, the inner ones becoming the high-pressure cylinders. However they did not achieve the higher performance required, just a lower fuel consumption of around 15%.
  
The Deutsche Reichsbahn took over five of these locomotives as DRG Class 14.1 with numbers 14 101 to 14 105, but by 1926 they were retired from service. Also grouped into Class 14.1 were the Bavarian S 2/5s.

The locomotives were equipped with tenders of the Bavarian Class 3 T 16.

See also
 Royal Bavarian State Railways
 Palatinate Railway
 List of Bavarian locomotives and railbuses
 List of Palatine locomotives and railbuses

References

Literature 
 Mühl, Albert (1982). Die Pfalzbahn: Geschichte, Betrieb und Fahrzeuge der pfälzischen Eisenbahnen. Theiss. 252 pp.

4-4-2 locomotives
P 3.I
Railway locomotives introduced in 1898
Krauss locomotives
Standard gauge locomotives of Germany
2′B1′ n2 locomotives
2′B1′ n4v locomotives
Passenger locomotives